The Hong Kong League XI, also known as the Hong Kong XI or Hong Kong League Selection, is a football team which represents the Hong Kong First Division League in exhibition matches, mainly the Lunar New Year Cup.

The team is selected from the top players in the Hong Kong First Division League. Both Hong Kong and foreign players, including those from mainland China, can be included in the team. However, as the quality of local players is usually lower, it has been often that most of the outfield players are foreigners.

In recent years, to order to enable local footballers to gain more international experience,  the Hong Kong Football Association has fielded the Hong Kong national football team in matches which were previously played by the Hong Kong League XI. Therefore, the League XI has not formed a squad for a few years. However, the team returned and competed in the 2007 Lunar New Year Cup.

Historical matches

1957

1958

1959

1960

1961

Recent Matches

Players

Most recent squad
Squad selected for the match against Hong Kong Representative Team on 26 January 2020.

 Head coach: Liu Chun Fai 
 Coach: Anílton, Chan Ka Ki

Competition history

Minor tournaments

Footnotes

References

External links
HK League XI, squad for the 2007 Lunar New Year Cup

Hong Kong First Division League
Representative teams of association football leagues